Amanda Figueras (born Vilafranca del Penedès, Barcelona; born 1978) is a Spanish journalist and writer who worked for El Mundo for more than a decade.

Career
Figueras holds a degree in Journalism and studied for one year in a Portuguese university in line with the Erasmus Programme. Also, she has informal studies of Islamic culture and since 2004 she also writes about the Muslim community. After working for a decade as a journalist for Spanish daily El Mundo, where she has been successfully involved finding synergies between the online and the print edition and established the European Affairs section. After converting to Islam, she wrote a book called "Why Islam: my life as a woman, European and Muslim." She said her journey to Islam started in the aftermath of the 2004 Madrid train bombings when she was working in El Mundo. She is a United Nations Alliance of Civilizations fellow and lives between Madrid and Cairo. In 2015, she began working as a project manager at Foro Abraham for Interfaith and Intercultural Dialogue. She is also Fellow of the International Dialogue Center Kaiciid. Among the publications she writes articles for is The Islamic Monthly.

Personal life
Figueras shares her faith with her Egyptian husband and a three-year-old son.

References

Spanish women journalists
Spanish Muslims
Converts to Islam
Writers from Barcelona
Spanish women writers
Living people
1978 births
Alumni of the Erasmus Programme
21st-century Spanish journalists
Journalists from Catalonia